Žáky is a municipality and village in Kutná Hora District in the Central Bohemian Region of the Czech Republic. It has about 400 inhabitants.

Administrative parts
The village of Štrampouch is an administrative part of Žáky.

Notable people
Alexander Dreyschock (1818–1869), pianist and composer

References

Villages in Kutná Hora District